Final Approach may refer to:

 Final approach (aeronautics), the last leg in an aircraft's approach to landing
 Final Approach (1991 film), a thriller starring James Sikking
 Final Approach (2007 film), a TV action thriller starring Dean Cain
 Final Approach (visual novel), a Japanese visual novel and adapted anime series
 "Final Approach" (Wings), the two-part finale of American TV series Wings
 "Final Approach" (MacGyver), an episode from the second season of MacGyver